Miss Moldova is a national beauty pageant responsible for selecting Moldova's representative to the Miss World pageant.

Titleholders
Color key

Miss World Moldova

Miss International Moldova
Color key

Miss Earth Moldova
Color key

External links
missmoldova.md

References

Moldova
Moldova
Recurring events established in 1999
1999 establishments in Moldova
Beauty pageants in Moldova
Moldovan awards